The Jersey Wooly is a breed of domestic rabbit weighing about 3 pounds with a bold head and easy-care wool fur on their body. They are noted for their docile nature, and gentle disposition.

Origins
Bonnie Seeley of High Bridge, New Jersey, introduced the Jersey Wooly at the 1984 American Rabbit Breeders Association (ARBA) Convention in Orlando, Florida. It was recognized by the ARBA in 1988. Today, the Jersey Wooly is one of the most widely-exhibited rabbits at local and national shows in the United States. They are also renowned as highly docile pets.

The Jersey Wooly was developed by crossing the Netherland Dwarf and the French Angora. The result of this cross was a petite rabbit with a wool coat. Early Jersey Woolies still maintained the oblong body shape of the French Angora, made smaller by the influence of the dwarfing gene.

Appearance and personality
A full grown Jersey Wooly weighs 1 - 1.5 kg (2.5 - 3.5 pounds) with 3 lbs being considered ideal. They have a compact body type. The ears are small and erect, standing about 2 inches long. 3 inch ears are the maximum length allowed for exhibition stock per the ARBA's Standard of Perfection. When showing a Jersey Wooly, people must know that the head and ears have the most points. The head is bold and squarish which led the breed to being affectionately referred to as the "Mug Head."  These rabbits are very affectionate and playful and most Jersey Woolys have very friendly personalities. As pets, they range from laid-back lap bunnies to outgoing explorers.

Lifespan
The average life span of a Jersey Wooly can depend on many factors, including genetics and care. It is not uncommon for a Jersey Wooly to live 7-10+ years when properly cared for. There is a common myth that those who have had litters die sooner, but this has not been scientifically proven. Many rabbit breeders have healthy Jersey Woolys  who have had multiple litters live just as long as pet Jersey Woolys who have never had babies. It is also believed that neutering and spaying these rabbits will add years to their life span. Without neutering or spaying, rabbits can develop cancer and tumors that are life-threatening. A competent, experienced exotics veterinarian is the best way to minimize surgical complications.

See also

American Rabbit Breeders Association
List of rabbit breeds
National Jersey Wooly Rabbit Club
M an' M Rabbitry

References

Further reading

External links
Jersey Wooly Rabbit Breed History
Rabbit Breeds History

Rabbit breeds
Rabbits as pets
Rabbit breeds originating in the United States